Wilhelm Altmann (4 April 1862 – 25 March 1951) was a German historian and musicologist.

Altmann was born in Adelnau (Odolanów), Province of Posen, and died in Hildesheim. Wilhelm Altmann and his wife Marie née Louis are buried in Hildesheim, Peiner Straße on the cemetery Nordfriedhof (Zentralfriedhof). The couple had three children: Ulrich (1889-1950), Ursula (1894-1984) and Berthold (1896-1992).

Literary works
 Tonkünstlerlexikon, 121926
 Kammermusikliteratur, 51931

1862 births
1951 deaths
People from Ostrów Wielkopolski County
German music historians
German musicologists
People from the Province of Posen
German male non-fiction writers